Stigmella laqueorum is a species of moth in the family Nepticulidae. It is endemic to New Zealand. This species is classified as "At Risk, Naturally Uncommon" by the Department of Conservation.

Taxonomy
This species was originally described by John S. Dugdale under the name Nepticula laquaeorum. In 1988 Dugdale noted that the epithet laquaeorum was inadmissible and amended it to the correct spelling of laqueorum. He also placed the species within the genus Stigmella. The taxonomy of this species was also studied by Hans Donner and Christopher Wilkinson in 1989. The holotype specimen is held at the New Zealand Arthropod Collection.

Description
The larvae of this species are up to 6 mm long and pale green.

The adult moths have a forewing length of between 3–4 mm. This species is similar in appearance to its close relative Stigmella fulva. However it can be distinguished from that species as S. laqueorum has basally black costa and has no linear black scale marks on the discal cell area. S. laqueorum is also smaller and has more obvious wing markings than S. fulva.

Distribution 
This species is endemic to New Zealand. It can only be found on Snares Island.

Biology and behaviour 
The egg is laid on the leaf underside, amongst the thick tomentum. Larvae are present in all months. The cocoon is made of pale brown or tan silk and is attached to fallen large debris or trunk bases. Adults have been recorded on the wing from late November to February. They are diurnal, flying only in the morning.

Host species and habitat 
The larvae feed on Olearia lyallii. They mine the leaves of their host plant. The mine is narrow, serpentine, rather scribble-like and close to the upper epidermal layer, widening terminally. There may be up to 20 mines per leaf.

Conservation Status 
This species has been classified as having the "At Risk, Naturally Uncommon" conservation status under the New Zealand Threat Classification System.

References

Nepticulidae
Moths described in 1971
Moths of New Zealand
Endemic fauna of New Zealand
Endangered biota of New Zealand
Endemic moths of New Zealand